The Sarawak National Party known by its acronym as "SNAP", is now a defunct political party in Malaysia. It was a member party of the Alliance Party from 1963 to 1966 and a member of Barisan Nasional (BN) coalition from 1976 until its expulsion in 2004. It contested the General Election in 2004 as well as the Sarawak state elections of 2006 and 2011 as an opposition party.

SNAP joined the federal opposition Pakatan Rakyat (PR) coalition from April 2010 to April 2011.

SNAP was initially deregistered on 5 November 2002 by the Registrar of Societies (RoS). and was uphold by the Federal Court of Malaysia on 17 January 2013 because its failure to resolve the party leadership crisis.

History

Early years
The SNAP was formed on 10 April 1961, the third party to be formed after the Sarawak United Peoples' Party (SUPP) and Parti Negara Sarawak (PANAS), open the way for Dayaks' active participation not only in the effort to prepare Sarawak's Independence, but also to be fully involved in political activities. Although there were Dayak in SUPP and PANAS, which were and are objectives respectively, the Dayaks' interest in the two parties were secondary and their roles minimal.

Thus the Dayaks, particularly the Ibans felt that they might be left behind in the decision making of Sarawak that was desirous of becoming an independent country, if they did not have their own. So SNAP was born in Betong, Second Division, and its formation was greatly welcomed by the vast majority of the Ibans, who formed one-third of Sarawak's population then. Among the founders were Stephen Kalong Ningkan, who become its secretary-general, Jonathan Samuel Tinker (Chairman), Edward Howell, Edwin Howell, Ivory Kedit, Mathew Dana Ujai, David Lawrence Usit, Nyipa Julin and Lionel Bediman Anak Ketit.

The first general assembly of the party was held on 29 April 1961 at Munggu Bangkit, Betong, where the party was born. It became the party headquarters. About 300 people throughout Sarawak attend the assembly. Soon after the assembly, Ningkan and Tinker went to the First, Fourth and Fifth Divisions canvassing for membership and at the same time forming branches and sub-branches. It took them three months before returning to Betong. Edward Jeli who joined the party later canvassed for membership in Miri while others concentrated in the Second Division.

After serious thoughts, SNAP accepted non-Dayaks as party members in 1963 with James Wong Kim Min as the first Chinese to join as a member. Others who later joined the party included Wee Hood Teck, Wee Boon Ping and Ho Ah Chon. Abang Othman Bin Datuk Abang Haji Moasili was the first Malay to join the party.

Wee Hood Teck and Wee Boon Ping became the main financers of the party. Their presence and that of other non-Dayaks made SNAP a multi-racial party, although the bulk of its members were Dayaks.

In August 1962, another party came into being in Sibu to cater for the Ibans of Batang Rajang. Its promoters refused to join SNAP, which they said, only catered for Ibans from Saribas. The party was known as Parti Pesaka Anak Sarawak (PESAKA) and among the initiators were Penghulu Masam Anak Radin, Pengarah Banyang, Penghulu Chundi Anak Resa and Penghulu Umpau. Temenggong Jugah, Temenggong Oyong Lawai Jau and Jonathan Bangau joined later. While Jugah and Oyong Lawai Jau were incipiently members of PANAS, Bangau was from SUPP. Others Penghulus from other divisions such as Penghulu Tawi Sli (Second Division) and Penghulu Abok Anak Jalin (Bintulu) also joined PESAKA. PESAKA was, therefore, known as the Penghulus' Party (Malay: Parti Penghulu).

However, the person who actually mooted the idea of forming PESAKA was Thomas Kana, a former dresser at Kuala Belait. He was made the first secretary-general of the party. Incidentally, Ningkan, a SNAP founding member, was also a dresser at Kuala Belait. During their days in Kuala Belait, Ningkan and Kana greatly disliked one another and often threw insults at one another. When they returned to Sarawak, Ningkan formed SNAP and Kana formed PESAKA and both started to sow the seeds of disunity among the Ibans of Sarawak principally between the Ibans of Batang Rajang and the Iban of Saribas. They refused to compromise as both wanted to become "big" in a party and in the government. As far-fetched as it may be, Dayak unity, as we know it today took roots in the major differences and personal animosity of these two men.

1983 leadership crisis
The crisis began in June 1980 when Dunstan Endawie Enchana who was the deputy chief minister of Sarawak and the president of SNAP, resigned from the party presidency. He was later appointed to Malaysian High Commissioner to New Zealand. Dunstan wanted Daniel Tajem to succeed him as the deputy chief minister while James Wong to become the president of the party. Joseph Samuel was also nominated for the party president post by party members. In a 25-member meeting, the delegates overwhelmingly supported Joseph Samuel for Sarawak deputy chief minister. However, Abdul Rahman Ya'kub, who was the chief minister of Sarawak, went against their wishes and appointed Daniel Tajem as the new deputy chief minister of Sarawak. Abdul Rahman's action has caused anger among the SNAP members because their wish was not respected.

Leo Moggie was appointed as the party acting president after that. In March 1981, Abdul Rahman stepped down from the chief minister post and succeeded by his nephew Abdul Taib Mahmud. During SNAP party election in December 1981, James Wong challenged Leo Moggie for the president post. Moggie faction felt that SNAP, being a Dayak-based party, should be led by a Dayak instead of a Chinese. However, Wong's faction felt that James Wong has contributed so much to the party so he should be given an opportunity to lead the party. James Wong successfully defeated Moggie in the party president's race by a narrow majority of 15 votes. A supporter of Leo Moggie, Daniel Tajem also lost the vice-president post to Wong's supporter, Edward Jeli. James Wong tried to calm down the party by offering vice-president posts to Leo Moggie and Daniel Tajem. However, such offering did not satisfy Moggie's faction.

The Malaysian parliament was dissolved on 29 March 1982 to make way for 1982 general election. James Wong tried to exclude Leo Moggie's supporters (Edmund Langgu, Edwin Tangkun, and Jonathan Narwin) in contesting for the parliamentary election. Chief minister Abdul Taib Mahmud decided to honour the list of candidates submitted by James Wong. However, Sarawak ruling coalition Barisan Nasional (BN) led by Taib, lost 5 parliamentary seats to the opposition. SNAP was a component party of BN at that time. Three seats were lost to Patrick Uren, Edmund Langgu, and Edwin Tanggun where all of them were former SNAP members contesting against the SNAP party.

In 1983, Daniel Tajem, who was still the deputy chief minister of Sarawak, was expelled from the SNAP party because he was found guilty of helping the former SNAP candidates to contest against the official candidates listed by SNAP party in 1982 parliamentary election. However, Daniel Tajem refused to step down from the deputy chief minister post. Subsequently, in July 1983, Daniel Tajem and Leo Moggie formed a new party named Parti Bansa Dayak Sarawak (PBDS) in order to challenge James Wong's leadership in SNAP. Leo Moggie became the president of PBDS while Daniel Tajem became the deputy president of the party. PBDS immediately applied to join Taib's Barisan Nasional (BN) despite strong opposition by SNAP. PBDS was subsequently admitted into BN by Abdul Taib Mahmud despite strong opposition by Balang Seling, the secretary-general of SNAP. The decision to admit PBDS into BN was also welcomed by Mahathir Mohamad, the prime minister of Malaysia at that time.

The admission of PBDS into the BN has weakened the position of SNAP in the coalition because some of the electoral seats by SNAP would have to be given to PBDS. The formation of PBDS party further fragmented the voice of Dayak community in the Sarawak state government. The Dayak community was already divided between Muslim-bumiputera based Parti Pesaka Bumiputera Bersatu (PBB), Dayak-based Sarawak National Party (SNAP), and Chinese-based Sarawak United Peoples' Party (SUPP) before this. In 1983 elections, SNAP wanted to retain all the 18 seats it held previously in 1979 Sarawak state elections and was unwilling to give in to PBDS's demands for seats. Abdul Taib Mahmud, the chief minister of Sarawak at that time, then decided to allow SNAP to contest against PBDS in 1983 Sarawak state election under their respective party symbols instead of a common symbol of BN coalition. In this election, SNAP fielded candidates in 18 seats while PBDS fielded candidates in 14 seats. However, SNAP only managed to win 8 seats and PBDS won 6 seats after the election.

Joining Pakatan Rakyat
On 18 April 2010, SNAP officially became a member of the Pakatan Rakyat (PR), the federal opposition coalition. However, just before the  April 2011 Sarawak state election, SNAP withdrew from PR, citing seat allocation disagreements with People's Justice Party (PKR).

Dissolution
SNAP was declared a deregistered party first on 5 November 2002 by the RoS. The Federal Court of Malaysia had on 17 January 2013 uphold RoS decission declaring SNAP is no longer a registered party because it has unable to furnish evidence that leadership tussle in the party has been resolved.

SNAP Baru 
On 2021, Edmund Stanley Jugol, the last president of SNAP, founded a new party called as SNAP Baru. The party claimed to be the successor of the original SNAP, and is yet to register to RoS. It has declared support to PSB candidates in 2021 Sarawak state election.

General election results

State election results

See also 
 List of political parties in Malaysia
 Politics of Malaysia

References

External links 
 Sarawak National Party Official Facebook profile

Defunct political parties in Sarawak
1961 establishments in Malaya
2013 disestablishments in Malaysia
Political parties established in 1961
Political parties disestablished in 2013